The following are statistics of Primera División de México, the premier soccer division in Mexico, for the 1994–95 season.

Overview 
It was contested by 19 teams, and Necaxa won the championship.

The U. de G. franchise briefly disappeared after being acquired by a few Primera Division A teams.

Tampico Madero was promoted from Segunda División. The team started the season playing in Tamaulipas, but on week 16, the team was moved to Querétaro and changed its name to TM Gallos Blancos, the owner cited leasing problems at his original venue.

TM Gallos Blancos and Correcaminos UAT were relegated to Primera División 'A', the new second-level league in the Mexican system. For the 1995–96 season, the number of participating teams was reduced to 18.

Toros Neza returned to Ciudad Nezahualcóyotl after one season playing in Pachuca.

Teams

Group stage

Group 1

Group 2

Group 3

Group 4

Overall Table

Results

Playoff

Repechaje round 
 If the two teams are tied after two legs, the higher-seeded team advances.

Series tied 1–1 on aggregate. Puebla advanced as higher-seeded team.

Series tied 2–2 on aggregate. Tecos advanced as higher-seeded team.

Playoff round

Quarter-finals 

Series tied 3–3 on aggregate. Guadalajara advanced to semi-finals by away goals rule.

Necaxa won 4–1 on aggregate.

America won 4–2 on aggregate.

Aggregate tied 1-1. Cruz Azul advanced to semi-finals as best seeded team.

Semi-finals 

Aggregate tied 1-1. Necaxa advanced to final by away goals rule.

Cruz Azul won 2–3 on aggregate.

Final 

Necaxa won 3–1 on aggregate.

Relegation table

References 

Mexico – List of final tables (RSSSF)

Liga MX seasons
1994–95 in Mexican football
Mex